Mamani Mamani is an Aymara artist from Bolivia.  His work is significant in its use of Aymara indigenous tradition and symbols.  His art has been exhibited around the world, including shows in Washington, D.C., Tokyo, Munich, China, Singapore, and London.

Mamani Mamani's paintings draw upon his Aymara heritage, and include colorfully stylized images of indigenous mothers, condors, suns, and moons, among other themes.  Mamani Mamani uses strong vibrant colors similar to the colors featured in the traditional handmade weavings that are widely used by the indigenous people of the Bolivian Altiplano.  His use of indigenous symbols is especially significant in the South American context where indigenous cultures have been viewed as inferior to European culture.

In 2016, he made murals at the walls of the Wiphala social housing complex, located in El Alto.

References

External links
 Official website
Official Blog

Bolivian painters
Bolivian people of Aymara descent
Living people
Latin American artists of indigenous descent
Place of birth missing (living people)
21st-century indigenous painters of the Americas
1962 births